Euxoa obelisca, the square-spot dart, is a moth of the family Noctuidae. It is found in the Palearctic realm (Europe, Central Asia, North Africa Asia minor).

Technical description and variation

Forewing purplish brown; costa pale to outer line: cell dark brown; stigmata large, greyish ochreous: the claviform dark; hindwing in male white, with narrow grey shade along margin, in female more or less grey-tinged throughout.- in ab. fictilis Hbn. the forewing is more variegated, the submarginal line preceded by a row of distinct black teeth; - ab. ruris Hbn. , larger than typical, reddish grey or reddish brown, with or without the pale costa: stigmata large and pale: - ab. villiersii Guen. is also larger than typical; forewing ochreous grey with costa and both stigmata whitish, darker in the female; — ab. plectoides Guen. the same size as type, forewing with more acute apex, deep shining violet brown, with traces of subterminal only: costa and stigmata (which are small) pale testaceous; the orbicular somewhat angulated, the reniform constricted in middle: claviform obsolete: the cell deep black; hindwing very dark; described from a female only from Lapland; omitted by Staudinger, but probably a distinct species: a very distinct form from the Urals, which may be called ab. carbonis nov.[Warren] has the ground colour purplish black, with the costal streak and upper stigmata pale and the cell deep black: all the lines indistinct: several examples of both sexes sent from Uralsk by M. Bartel.

The caterpillar is obscure greyish or brownish, with a dark-edged pale line along the middle of the dorsum, and a dusky line on each side of it; low down on the sides is another dusky line.

Biology
The moth flies from July to October depending on the location.

The larvae feed on various herbaceous plants, such as Helianthemum nummularium and Galium species.

Similar species

Euxoa obelisca  is difficult to certainly distinguish from its congeners. See Townsend et al.Euxoa tritici (Linnaeus, 1761) Euxoa nigricans (Linnaeus, 1761) Euxoa cursoria'' (Hufnagel, 1766)

References

External links
Lepiforum
Funet Taxonomy
Fauna Europaea
waarneming.nl 
Vlindernet 
Square-spot dart at UKmoths

Moths described in 1775
Euxoa
Moths of Africa
Moths of Asia
Moths of Europe
Taxa named by Michael Denis
Taxa named by Ignaz Schiffermüller